A traffic jam is a colloquial term for traffic congestion.

Traffic jam may also refer to:

Traffic Jam (film), a 1979 Italian film
"Traffic Jam" (Malcolm in the Middle episode)
"Traffic Jam" (King of the Hill episode)
"Traffic Jam", a song by "Weird Al" Yankovic from the album Alapalooza
 Traffic Jam, a song by Bappi Lahiri from the Hindi film Rock Dancer
Traffic Jam, an early name of the band Status Quo